Flight 90 of the North American X-15 was a research flight conducted by NASA and the US Air Force on July 19, 1963. It was the first of two X-15 missions that passed the 100-km high Kármán line, the FAI definition of space, along with Flight 91 the next month. The X-15 was flown by Joseph A. Walker, who flew both X-15 spaceflights over the Kármán line.

Crew

Mission parameters
Mass: 15,195 kg fueled; 6,577 kg burnout; 6,260 kg landed
Maximum Altitude: 106.01 km., 347,800 feet
Range: 534 km
Burn Time: 84.6 seconds
Mach: 5.50
Launch Vehicle: NB-52B Bomber #008

Mission highlights
Maximum Speed - 5,971 km/h. Maximum Altitude - 106,010 m. 80 cm diameter balloon towed on 30 m line to measure air density. First X-15 flight over 100 km (a height known as the Kármán line). This made Walker the first US civilian in space. This was also the first spaceflight of a spaceplane in aviation history. First flight launched over Smith Dry Lake, NV. Experiments: Towed balloon, horizon scanner, photometer, infrared and ultraviolet. Balloon instrumentation failed.

The mission was flown by X-15 #3, serial 56–6672 on its 21st flight.

Launched by: NB-52B #008, Pilots Fulton & Bement. Takeoff: 17:19. UTC Landing: 19:04 UTC.

Chase pilots: Crews, Dana, Rogers, Daniel and Wood.

The X-15 engine burned about 85 seconds. Near the end of the burn, acceleration built up to about 4g (39 m/s²). Weightlessness lasted for 3 to 5 minutes. Re-entry heating warmed the exterior of the X-15 to 650 °C in places. During pull up after re-entry, the acceleration built up to 5g (49 m/s²) for 20 seconds. The entire flight lasted about 12 minutes from launch to landing.

Notes

References

 

 

1963 in spaceflight
090